North Irwin is a borough in Westmoreland County, Pennsylvania, United States. The population was 846 at the time of the 2010 census.

Geography
North Irwin is located at  (40.338119, -79.710966).

Demographics

As of the census of 2000, there were 879 people, 381 households, and 243 families living in the borough.

The population density was 4,307.2 people per square mile (1,696.9/km2). There were 393 housing units at an average density of 1,925.8 per square mile (758.7/km2).

The racial makeup of the borough was 98.29% White, 0.11% African American, 0.46% Native American, and 1.14% from two or more races. Hispanic or Latino of any race were 0.23% of the population.

There were 381 households, out of which 28.6% had children under the age of eighteen living with them; 50.9% were married couples living together, 9.7% had a female householder with no husband present, and 36.2% were non-families. 33.3% of all households were made up of individuals, and 13.9% had someone living alone who was 65 years of age or older.

The average household size was 2.31 and the average family size was 2.96.

In the borough, the population was spread out, with 22.5% under the age of eighteen, 8.1% from eighteen to twenty-four, 30.8% from twenty-five to forty-four, 22.5% from forty-five to sixty-four, and 16.0% who were sixty-five years of age or older. The median age was thirty-nine years.

For every one hundred females, there were 94.0 males. For every one hundred females aged eighteen and over, there were 95.1 males.

The median income for a household in the borough was $33,750, and the median income for a family was $40,217. Males had a median income of $29,318 versus $19,881 for females.

The per capita income for the borough was $15,665.

Roughly 4.8% of families and 5.8% of the population were living below the poverty line, including 6.0% of those who were under the age of eighteen and 9.4% of those aged sixty-five or over.

References

Boroughs in Westmoreland County, Pennsylvania
Populated places established in 1894
Pittsburgh metropolitan area
1894 establishments in Pennsylvania